State Highway 21 (SH 21)  runs from the Texas-Louisiana boundary east of San Augustine to San Marcos in east and central Texas.  SH 21 mostly follows the alignment of the Old San Antonio Road and the El Camino Real, except for the portion between Midway and Bryan, where the Old San Antonio Road took a more northerly route, and SH 21 follows a more direct route.  That section of the Old San Antonio Road is served by Texas State Highway OSR.

History

SH 21 was one of the original 25 routes proposed in Texas on June 21, 1917 along a route from the Louisiana border east of St. Augustine to Gonzales, overlaid on top of the Gonzales-St. Augustine Highway. There was proposed extension southward to Karnes City on February 18, 1918. On July 16, 1923, the terminus was shortened to Giddings, with the section south of there being cancelled. A spur, SH 21 Spur, was designated on March 19, 1930 from Milam to Hemphill. On August 1, 1930, this spur became part of SH 87. On September 29, 1933, SH 21 was extended to Lockhart. On July 15, 1935, the section from Giddings to Lockhart was cancelled, and SH 21 was rerouted though Lincoln, replacing part of SH OSR, and followed SH 44 to Giddings. On October 21, 1936, SH 21 Spur to Chireno was added. On May 18, 1937, the spur in Chireno became a loop, SH 21 Loop. On February 21, 1938, another SH 21 Spur to McMahan's Chapel was added. On April 19, 1938, the section of SH 21 from Lincoln to Giddings was cancelled, and SH 21 was extended to Bastrop, replacing part of SH OSR. On September 26, 1939, the section from Paige to Bastrop was cancelled, as it was already part of US 290. The spur and loop became Loop 34 (Chireno) and Spur 35 (McMahan's Chapel). On August 2, 1943, the western terminus had been extended to end in San Marcos, along its current route, replacing part of SH OSR.

On June 24, 2010, the SH 21 designation was extended along SH 80 and SH 142 to end at I-35.

Major intersections

Business routes
SH 21 has two business routes.

Kurten business route

The route was formed from an old section of SH 21 on February 28, 2002, when SH 21 proper was moved onto a new bypass around Kurten.

Nacogdoches business route

The route was formed from an old section of SH 21, when the main highway was re-routed onto Loop 224 and US 59 on October 25, 2018.

Major intersections

References

External links
 

021
Transportation in Sabine County, Texas
Transportation in San Augustine County, Texas
Transportation in Nacogdoches County, Texas
Transportation in Cherokee County, Texas
Transportation in Houston County, Texas
Transportation in Madison County, Texas
Transportation in Brazos County, Texas
Transportation in Burleson County, Texas
Transportation in Lee County, Texas
Transportation in Bastrop County, Texas
Transportation in Caldwell County, Texas
Transportation in Hays County, Texas
Bryan, Texas